Parliamentary elections were held in Mongolia on 10 June 1951. At the time, the country was a one-party state under the rule of the Mongolian People's Revolutionary Party. The MPRP won 176 of the 294 seats, with the remaining 118 seats going to non-party candidates, who had been chosen by the MPRP due to their social status. Voter turnout was reported to be 99.9%.

Results

References

Mongolia
1951 in Mongolia
Elections in Mongolia
One-party elections
Election and referendum articles with incomplete results